Søndre Land is a municipality in Innlandet county, Norway. It is located in the traditional district of Land. The administrative centre of the municipality is the village of Hov. Other villages in the municipality include Fluberg and Odnes.

The  municipality is the 156th largest by area out of the 356 municipalities in Norway. Søndre Land is the 171st most populous municipality in Norway with a population of 5,535.

General information
The old Land Municipality was established on 1 January 1838 after the formannskapsdistrikt law went into effect. This municipality was quite large and in less than a decade, the municipality was divided. In 1847, the old Land Municipality was divided into Nordre Land (population: 4,595) in the north and Søndre Land (population: 4,604) in the south. On 1 January 1868, a part of Søndre Land (population: 340) was transferred to Nordre Land. On 1 January 1900, an unpopulated area of Søndre Land was transferred to the neighboring municipality of Vardal. On 1 January 1914, Søndre Land municipality was divided into two municipalities: Fluberg (population: 2,027) in the north and Søndre Land (population: 3,374) in the south. During the 1960s, there were many municipal mergers across Norway due to the work of the Schei Committee. On 1 January 1962, the municipality of Søndre Land (population: 4,339) was merged with most of the neighboring municipality of Fluberg (population: 2,110).

Name
The municipality was named after the historical district of Land which was once a petty kingdom of its own. The Old Norse form of the name was Land which means "land". In 1847, when the old Land Municipality was divided, the municipality was named Søndre Land, using the old name plus the word Søndre which means "southern", therefore the name means "(the) southern (part of) Land".

Coat of arms
The coat of arms was granted on 21 June 1985. The official blazon is "In Azure, three branched tree trunks in bend Or". This means the arms have a blue field (background) and the charge is branched tree trunks. The tree trunks have a tincture of Or which means it is colored yellow most of the time, but if it is made out of metal, then gold is used. The blue color in the field symbolizes the water of the Randsfjorden which dominates the central part of the municipality. The tree trunks were chosen to symbolise the importance of forestry and the sawmills in the municipality.

Churches
The Church of Norway has three parishes within the municipality of Søndre Land. It is part of the Hadeland og Land prosti (deanery) in the Diocese of Hamar.

Geography

Søndre Land is bordered on the north by Nordre Land Municipality, on the east by Gjøvik Municipality and Vestre Toten Municipality, on the west by Sør-Aurdal Municipality, and on the south by Gran Municipality in Innlandet county.  It is also bordered to the west by Ringerike Municipality in Buskerud county.

It lies in the south of Innlandet and on the northern end of the 4th largest lake in Norway, Randsfjorden. The lake Vestre Bjonevatnet lies in the southwestern corner of the municipality.

Government
All municipalities in Norway, including Søndre Land, are responsible for primary education (through 10th grade), outpatient health services, senior citizen services, unemployment and other social services, zoning, economic development, and municipal roads.  The municipality is governed by a municipal council of elected representatives, which in turn elects a mayor.  The municipality falls under the Vestre Innlandet District Court and the Eidsivating Court of Appeal.

Municipal council
The municipal council  of Søndre Land is made up of 17 representatives that are elected to four year terms.  The party breakdown of the council is as follows:

Mayors
The mayors of Søndre Land (incomplete list):
1946–1975: Bernt Skjølaas (Ap)
1976–1982: Kåre Inngjerdingen (Ap)
1982–1994: Bjørn Hansen (Ap)
1994–1999: Ellen H. Magnussen (Ap)
1999–2011: Reidar Eriksen (LL)
2011–2019: Terje Odden (Ap)
2019–present: Anne Hagenborg (Ap)

Media gallery

Notable residents

 Christian Ancher (1711-1765) a Norwegian merchant, timber trader and ship owner
 Peder Aadnes (1739–1792) a Norwegian rural painter
 Jørgen Meinich (1820-1911) a Norwegian jurist and wood processor
 Martin Smeby (1891-1975), politician, Mayor of Søndre Land in 1930's
 Ola Viker (1897-1942) a Norwegian novelist and lawyer
 Håvard Narum (born 1944) a Norwegian journalist and author.
 Ola Skjølaas (1941-2006) a Norwegian veterinarian, civil servant and politician
 Per Blom (1946-2013) a Norwegian film director  
 Finn Thrana (1958–2006) a Norwegian barrister and civil servant for Nasjonal Samling
 Ellen Andrea Wang (born 1986) a Norwegian jazz double bass player, singer and composer

References

External links

Municipal fact sheet from Statistics Norway 

 
Municipalities of Innlandet
Land, Norway
1847 establishments in Norway